The Tettigometridae are a family of Fulgoromorpha (planthoppers), with an Old World species distribution.

Subfamilies, tribes and genera
Fulgoromorpha Lists On the Web includes the following:

Egropinae
Auth.: Baker, 1924 (West Africa, Indo-China, Malesia)
tribe Cyranometrini Bourgoin, 1987
 Cyranometra Bourgoin, 1987
tribe Egropini Baker, 1924
 Egropa Melichar, 1903
 Megaloplastinx Schmidt, 1912

Nototettigometrinae
Auth.: Bourgoin, 2018
 Apohilda Bourgoin, 1986
 Euphyonarthex Schmidt, 1912
 Hildadina Bourgoin, 1986
 Megahilda Fennah, 1959
 Nototettigometra Muir, 1924
 Raatzbrockmannia Schmidt, 1924

Phalixinae
Auth.: Ghauri, 1964 (central Africa)
 Phalix Fennah, 1952

Tettigometrinae

Auth.: Germar, 1821
tribe Plesiometrini Bourgoin, 2018
 Mesohilda Fennah, 1952
 Parahilda Knight, 1964
 Plesiometra Bourgoin, 1986
tribe Tettigometrini Germar, 1821
 Tettigometra Latreille, 1804 - type genus

References

External links

Auchenorrhyncha families
Hemiptera of Asia
Hemiptera of Europe
Hemiptera of Africa